Right Now! is an album by American saxophonist Jackie McLean recorded in 1965 and released on the Blue Note label. It features McLean in a quartet with pianist Larry Willis, bassist Bob Cranshaw and drummer Clifford Jarvis.

Reception
The Allmusic review by Scott Yanow awarded the album 4½ stars and stated: "Altoist McLean was at the peak of his powers during this period and, inspired by the versatile rhythm section... a particularly strong example of Jackie McLean's unique inside/outside music of the 1960s."

Track listing
 "Eco" (McLean) - 6:09
 "Poor Eric" (Larry Willis) - 10:12
 "Christel's Time" (Willis) - 10:34
 "Right Now" (Charles Tolliver) - 9:29
 "Right Now" [Alternate Take] - 11:42 Bonus track on CD reissue

Personnel
Jackie McLean - alto saxophone
Larry Willis - piano
Bob Cranshaw - bass
Clifford Jarvis - drums

References

Blue Note Records albums
Jackie McLean albums
1966 albums
Albums recorded at Van Gelder Studio
Albums produced by Alfred Lion